BO Microscopii (BO Mic) is a star in the constellation Microscopium located about  from the Sun. It has been dubbed "Speedy Mic" because of its very rapid rotation. The photosphere of this star shows a high level of magnetic activity, with multiple star spots and prominences observed at the same time. As many as 25 prominences have been observed simultaneously, extending outward as far as 3.6 times the radius of the star. BO Mic is a flare star that undergoes sudden increases in X-ray and ultraviolet emissions. These events can emit a hundred times more energy than large solar flares. Speedy Mic is one of the most active stars in the vicinity of the Sun.

References

Microscopium
K-type main-sequence stars
Flare stars
Micrscopii, BO
197890
102626
Durchmusterung objects